Princess Maria Theresia of Thurn and Taxis, (full German name: Maria Theresia, Prinzessin von Thurn und Taxis, 6 July 1794 in Regensburg, Free Imperial City of Regensburg, Holy Roman Empire – 18 August 1874 in Hütteldorf, Penzing, Vienna, Austria-Hungary) was a member of the House of Thurn and Taxis and a Princess of Thurn and Taxis by birth and a member of the House of Esterházy and Princess Esterházy of Galántha from 25 November 1833 to 21 May 1866 through her marriage to Paul III Anthony, 8th Prince Esterházy of Galántha.

Family
Maria Theresia was the third child and second daughter of Karl Alexander, 5th Prince of Thurn and Taxis and his wife Duchess Therese of Mecklenburg-Strelitz. She was an elder sister of Maximilian Karl, 6th Prince of Thurn and Taxis.

Marriage and issue
Maria Theresia married Prince Paul Anthony Esterházy of Galántha, eldest child and son of Nicholas II, 7th Prince Esterházy of Galántha and his wife Princess Maria Josepha of Liechtenstein, on 18 June 1812 in Regensburg, Kingdom of Bavaria. Maria Theresia and Paul Anthony had three children:

Princess Maria Theresia Esterházy of Galántha (27 May 1813 – 14 May 1894), ancestress of Gloria, Princess of Thurn and Taxis
Princess Theresia Rosa Esterházy of Galántha (12 July 1815 – 28 February 1894)
Nicholas III, 9th Prince Esterházy of Galántha (25 June 1817 – 28 January 1894)

Esterházy was a popular diplomat and Maria Theresia became admired by his contemporaries, especially during the Congress of Vienna. During his long tenure as Austrian Ambassador to the United Kingdom (1815-1842), she became a leader of fashionable society. She was invited to become one of the patronesses of Almack's, the centre of London social life: the patronesses had the final say as to who was and who was not socially acceptable. She was one of the most popular patronesses: due to her youth she was described as "a nice child".

Ancestry

References

|- 
! colspan="3" style="background: #ACE777; color: #000000" | Hungarian nobility

1794 births
1874 deaths
People from Regensburg
Princesses of Thurn und Taxis
German Roman Catholics
Princesses Esterházy of Galántha